The women's 200 metres competition at the 2018 Asian Games took place on 28 and 29 August 2018 at the Gelora Bung Karno Stadium.

Schedule
All times are Western Indonesia Time (UTC+07:00)

Records

Results
Legend
DSQ — Disqualified

Round 1
 Qualification: First 3 in each heat (Q) and the next 4 fastest (q) advance to the semifinals.

Heat 1
 Wind: +0.4 m/s

Heat 2
 Wind: −0.3 m/s

Heat 3
 Wind: −0.1 m/s

Heat 4
 Wind: −0.1 m/s

Semifinals
 Qualification: First 3 in each heat (Q) and the next 2 fastest (q) advance to the final.

Heat 1 
 Wind: +0.1 m/s

Heat 2 
 Wind: +0.1 m/s

Final
 Wind: −0.7 m/s

References

Results

Women's 200 metres
2018 women